Sabulopteryx botanica is a species of moth in the family Gracillariidae. It is endemic to New Zealand. It was first described in 2019 by Robert Hoare and Brian Patrick. The larval host of this species is Teucrium parvifolium, a plant that has been classified as at risk by the Department of Conservation.

References 

Gracillariinae
Moths of New Zealand
Endemic fauna of New Zealand
Taxa named by Robert Hoare
Moths described in 2019